Pediasia abbreviatellus is a moth in the family Crambidae. It was described by Francis Walker in 1866. It is found in India.

References

Crambini
Moths described in 1866
Moths of Asia